GM Defense is the military product subsidiary of General Motors headquartered in Concord, North Carolina; focusing on the defense industry needs with hydrogen fuel cell and other advanced mobility technologies. GM Defense projects include SURUS (Silent Utility Rover Universal Superstructure) an autonomous modular platform joint project with the United States Army.

ZH2 are modified Chevrolet medium and full size pickups modified for military needs. The ZH2, fitted with a hydrogen fuel cell and electric drive, has a stealthy drive system which produces a very low smoke, noise, odor and thermal signature. This allows soldiers to conduct silent watch and silent mobility missions on the battlefield.

General Motors, the Office of Naval Research and the U.S. Naval Research Laboratory are cooperating to incorporate automotive hydrogen fuel cell systems into the next generation of Navy unmanned undersea vehicles, or UUVs. Hydrogen fuel cell technology could augment ships and subs on patrol.

History
The original GM Defense was founded in 1950, and acquired by General Dynamics in 2003. This later became part of the General Dynamics Land Systems division.

In 2017, General Motors announced the company's return to the defense industry.

Current projects

Previous products
Products produced by the former GM Defense in past include:

With the sale to General Dynamics, only the Stryker product lines are still in production. The M54 truck is no longer in production. MILCOT was transitioned to the US Army's COMBATT program.

Facilities

 Washington, DC - Headquarters
 Concord, NC - Infantry Squad Vehicle Production Facility

References

 General Motors Launches New Military Defense Division Called GM Defense Topspeed, Mark McNabb, October 9, 2017
 GM and U.S. Navy Collaborating on Fuel Cell-Powered Underwater Unmanned Vehicles, (GM Press release) June 2016

Further reading
 For Dangerous, Difficult or Demanding Situations, SURUS is Ready, GM.com, October 2018
 GM gets defense unit ready for deployment, May 12, 2018 Automotive News, Michael Wayland
 New GM product segment will focus on military, Detroit News, October 9, 2017, Ian Thibodeau
 General Motors Going Back Into the Defense Business, October 9, 2017, The Truth About Cars, Steph Willems
 GM works with Navy on underwater fuel-cell drones, Detroit Free Press, June 23, 2016, Greg Gardner

External links

 

General Dynamics
Defense companies of the United States
General Motors subsidiaries